Taunton is a rural locality in the Gladstone Region, Queensland, Australia.

History 
The locality takes its name from the parish, which in turn was named after an early pastoral station. from the parish name which was derived from an early pastoral run in the district, which is believed to be named after Taunton in England.

References 

Gladstone Region
Localities in Queensland